The National Society of Mural Painters (NSMP) is an American artists' organization originally known as The Mural Painters. The charter of the society is to advance the techniques and standards for the design and execution of mural art for the enrichment of architecture in the United States.

Background
The NSMP was founded in 1895, in an era of Beaux-Arts architecture in America, a time when public architecture was integrated with murals, sculpture, mosaics and other artwork, coordinated and themed to assert the identity of the building.  Parallel organizations associated with the same principles of integrated public art include the National Sculpture Society, which originally included a large percentage of architectural sculptors, and the Beaux-Arts Institute of Design, founded in 1916 as the teaching wing of the Society of Beaux-Arts Architects.

Still in existence after more than a hundred years, the society presents exhibitions and organizes competitions.  The NSMP is a member of the Fine Arts Federation of New York.

Past presidents of the Society include 
 

 Frederic Crowninshield 1895-1899
 John La Farge 1899-1904
 Charles Yardley Turner 1904-1909
 Edwin Blashfield 1909-1914
 John White Alexander 1914-1915
 Kenyon Cox 1915-1919
 George W. Breck 1919-1920
 J. Monroe Hewlett 1921-1926
 Arthur Covey 1926-1929
 Ernest Peixotto 1929-1935
 George Biddle 1935-1936
 Hildreth Meiere 1936-1937
 J. Scott Williams 1937-1938
 Geoffrey Norman 1939-1940
 Francine Baehr 1940-1941
 Griffith Bailey Coale 1941-1942
 Allyn Cox 1942-1946
 Hildreth Meiere 1946-1949
 Jan Juta 1949-1952
 Austin M. Purves, Jr. 1952-1953
 Dean Cornwell 1953-1957
 Charles Baskerville 1957-1960
 Allyn Cox 1960-1963
 Helen Treadwell 1963-1967
 Xavier Gonzales 1967-1969
 Max Spivak 1969-1970
 Edward Laning 1970-1974
 Buell Mullen 1974-1975
 Jan Juta 1975-1979
 Dean Fausett 1979-1984
 Alton S. Tobey 1984-1988
 Everett Molinari 1988-1991
 Rhoda Y. Andors 1991-1995
 Frank Mason 1995-1996
 Jack Stewart 1996-2000
 Robert Harding 2001-2005
 Jeff Greene 2005

Notable members
 Edith Barry
 Pietro Lazzari

External links 
 
 papers of the NSMP located at the Smithsonian Archives of American Art

American artist groups and collectives
Arts organizations based in New York City
Art societies
Arts organizations established in 1895
1895 establishments in the United States